The following is a list of Malayalam films released in 1976.

Dubbed films

References

 1976
1976
Lists of 1976 films by country or language
Fil